The Joy Range is a mountain range of the Arctic Cordillera.

Geography
The range is one of the northernmost mountain ranges in the world, along with the nearby Princess Margaret Range. It is located on southeastern Axel Heiberg Island, in Nunavut, Canada, North America.

History
The range is named after Alfred Herbert Joy, who is best known for a remarkable  patrol by dogsled across the heart of the Queen Elizabeth Islands in 1929.

See also
List of mountain ranges

References

External links

Arctic Cordillera
Mountain ranges of Qikiqtaaluk Region